Kentucky Route 281 (KY 281) is a  state highway in the U.S. state of Kentucky. The highway connects mostly rural areas of Hopkins County with Madisonville.

Route description
KY 281 begins at an intersection with U.S. Route 41 (US 41; North Main Street) in Madisonville, within Hopkins, where the roadway continues as US 41 Alt. (Nebo Road). It travels to the northeast and crosses over some CSX railroad tracks. Then, it has an interchange with Interstate 69 (I-69) and then curves to the north-northeast. Right after it leaves the city limits of Madisonville, it intersects the western terminus of KY 2281 (Carriage Lane). The highway crosses over Elk Creek and intersects the western terminus of KY 2338 (Carroll Gentry Road). It then intersects KY 862 (Charles Lenin Road). Just east of Hanson, it intersects KY 260 (Eastlawn Road). Just north of this intersection, it passes West Lawn and East Lawn cemeteries. The highway curves to the north-northwest and then back to the northeast. In Vandetta, it intersects the southern terminus of KY 1033 (Vandetta Road). It crosses over Otter Creek and then enters Jewell City, where it meets its northern terminus, an intersection with KY 138 (Jewell City Road).

Major intersections

See also

References

0281
Transportation in Hopkins County, Kentucky